The DShK 1938 (Cyrillic: ДШК, for , "Degtyaryov-Shpagin large-calibre") is a Soviet heavy machine gun with a V-shaped butterfly trigger, firing the 12.7×108mm cartridge. The weapon was also used as a heavy infantry machine gun, where it was frequently deployed with a two-wheeled mounting and a single-sheet armour-plate shield. The DShK's name is derived from its original designer, Vasily Degtyaryov, and Georgi Shpagin, who later improved the cartridge feed mechanism. It is sometimes nicknamed Dushka (a dear or beloved person) in Russian-speaking countries, from the abbreviation. Alongside the American M2 Browning, the DShK is the only .50 caliber machine gun designed prior to World War II that remains in service to the present day.

History
Requiring a heavy machine gun similar to the M2 Browning, development of the DShK began in the Soviet Union in 1929 and the first design was finalised by Vasily Degtyaryov in 1931. The initial design used the same gas operation from the Degtyaryov machine gun, and used a 30 round drum magazine, but had a poor rate of fire. Georgy Shpagin revised the design by changing it to a belt-fed with a rotary-feed cylinder, and the new machine gun began production in 1938 as the DShK 1938.

During World War II, the DShK was used by the Red Army, with a total of 9,000 produced during the war. It was used mostly in anti-aircraft roles on vehicles such as the GAZ-AA truck, IS-2 tank, ISU-152 self-propelled artillery, and the T-40 amphibious tank. After 1945, the DShK was exported widely to other countries in the Eastern Bloc.

In 1946, an improved variant was produced, with a revised muzzle and feeding system. Named the DShK 38/46 or DShK-M, over a million were produced from 1946-1980. The gun was also revised to become more reliable, and easier to manufacture. The new DShK was produced under license in Pakistan, Iran, Yugoslavia, Romania and Czechoslovakia. China produced their own variant of the design, designated the Type 54.

After World War II, DShKs were used widely by communist forces in Vietnam, starting with the Battle of Dien Bien Phu in 1954. While not as powerful as anti-aircraft cannons, the DShK was easier to smuggle through Vietnam, Cambodia and Laos. DShKs were a major threat to American aircraft in the Vietnam War, and of the 7,500 helicopters and fixed-wing aircraft lost during the war, most were destroyed by DShKs.

In June 1988, during The Troubles, a British Army Westland Lynx helicopter was hit 15 times by two Provisional IRA DShKs smuggled from Libya, and forced to crash-land near Cashel Lough Upper, south County Armagh.

DShKs were also used in 2004, against British troops in Al-Amarah, Iraq.

Rebel forces utilized DShKs in the Syrian civil war, often mounting the gun on cars. In 2012, the Syrian government claimed to have destroyed 40 such technicals on a highway in Aleppo and six in Dael.

The DShK began to be partially replaced in the Soviet Union by the NSV machine gun in 1971, and the Kord machine gun in 1998. The DShK remains in service, although it is no longer produced.

The weapon was used by Ukrainian forces in the 2022 Russian invasion of Ukraine to shoot down Iranian-made Shahed-136 drones. The DShKs are fitted with a searchlight when attacking drones, which MANPADS have been unable to destroy. As many of the DShKs have been left over from the Soviet Union, they have been both cost-effective and one of the most reliable methods of destroying drones.

Design 
The DShK is a belt-fed machine gun that uses a butterfly trigger. The DShK has two "spider web" ring sights for use against aircraft. It is used by infantry on tripod mounts, and is deployed on tanks and armored vehicles for use against infantry and aircraft; nearly all Russian-designed tanks use the DShK.

Users

 
  "DShkM" locally produced from a Chinese copy
 
 
 
 
  Type 54.
 
 
 
 
 
 
 
 
 
 
 : Produced DShKM variant.
 
 
 
 
 : Produced DShKM variant TK Vz.53 which included a four barrelled version.
 
 
 
 
 
 
 
 
 
 
 
 
 
 : Manufactured DShKM variant named MGD 12.7.
  called the "Doshka" by Iraqis
 
 
  Captured during Kargil War
 
 
 
 
 
 
 
 
 
 
 
  – Armed and Security Forces of Mali
 
 
 
 
 
 
 
 
 : Used by the Pakistan Army. DShKM variant produced locally.
 
  Produced locally
 
  Produced locally (still used with TR-85 tanks)
 
 : Used by Rwandan Peacekeepers in Darfur.
 
 
 
 
 
 
 
 
 : Passed on to successor states.
 
 
 : Used by Tamil Tigers. (former user)
 
 
 
 
 
 : Also produces a variant with a bipod and large muzzle brake for infantry usage
 
 
 : Manufactured DShKM variant.

Non-state users
 
 Iraqi insurgents
  Provisional IRA

Gallery

See also
FN BRG-15
HMG PK-16
 KPV heavy machine gun
 List of Russian weaponry

References

Further reading
 Leszek Erenfeicht (29 August 2012). "Dushka: The Soviet Fifty Caliber". Small Arms Defense Journal. Vol. 4, No. 3.

External links

 DShK and DShKM at guns.ru.
 Video of Operation

12.7×108 mm machine guns
Heavy machine guns
Machine guns of the Soviet Union
Military equipment introduced in the 1930s
World War II infantry weapons of the Soviet Union
World War II machine guns
Weapons and ammunition introduced in 1938